Stilbella is a genus of fungi in the family Bionectriaceae (order Hypocreales). A 1985 monograph includes 19 species. More recent estimates place about 60 species in the genus. The type species Stilbella fimetaria  (syn. Stilbella erythrocephala ) has a cosmopolitan distribution and grows on herbivore dung. It has pink or orange slimy conidia on white synnemata with phialidic conidiogenous cells. Several species have since been reclassified in other genera based on DNA phylogenies or the discovery of sexual states, such as Atractium, Stilbocrea, and Trichoderma.

Species
, Species Fungorum (in the Catalog of Life) accepts 60 species of Stilbella.

Stilbella aciculosa 
Stilbella albocitrina 
Stilbella albocitrina 
Stilbella albominuta 
Stilbella albominuta 
Stilbella aleuriata 
Stilbella aleuriata 
Stilbella aquigena 
Stilbella arndtii 
Stilbella aurantiocinnabarina 
Stilbella aureola 
Stilbella berteroi 
Stilbella bucidae 
Stilbella bucidae 
Stilbella bulbicola 
Stilbella byssiseda 
Stilbella bulbosa 
Stilbella clavispora 
Stilbella burmensis 
Stilbella byssiseda 
Stilbella candidula 
Stilbella capillamentosa 
Stilbella cinerea 
Stilbella clavispora 
Stilbella clavulata 
Stilbella clavulata 
Stilbella coccophila 
Stilbella emericellopsis 
Stilbella dielsiana 
Stilbella dolichoderinarum 
Stilbella ecuadorensis 
Stilbella eichlerae 
Stilbella elasticae 
Stilbella emericellopsis 
Stilbella fimetaria 
Stilbella fimetaria 
Stilbella flavoviridis 
Stilbella fusca 
Stilbella fusca 
Stilbella herbarum 
Stilbella heveae 
Stilbella hirsuta 
Stilbella hyalina 
Stilbella iwokramensis 
Stilbella jaapii 
Stilbella jaapii 
Stilbella karstenii 
Stilbella minutissima 
Stilbella larvarum 
Stilbella sebacea 
Stilbella ledermannii 
Stilbella stereicola 
Stilbella lutea 
Stilbella maxima 
Stilbella melastomataceae 
Stilbella mesenterica 
Stilbella minutissima 
Stilbella pellucidum 
Stilbella pezizoidea 
Stilbella proliferans 
Stilbella pseudomortierella 
Stilbella pubida 
Stilbella resinae 
Stilbella rosea 
Stilbella rubescens 
Stilbella rubicunda 
Stilbella sanguinea 
Stilbella sebacea 
Stilbella setiformis 
Stilbella stereicola 
Stilbella subinconspicua 
Stilbella theae 
Stilbella xanthopus

References

Hypocreales
Taxa described in 1900
Sordariomycetes genera
Taxa named by Gustav Lindau